Carson is a city in Los Angeles County, California, United States, in the South Bay region of Los Angeles, located  south of downtown Los Angeles and approximately  away from Los Angeles International Airport. Incorporated on February 20, 1968, Carson is the newest municipality in the South Bay region of Metropolitan Los Angeles. The city is locally known for its plurality of Filipino-Americans and immigrants. As of 2019, it was estimated that the city had a population of 91,394.

History 

The year 1921 marked the first drilling for oil at Dominguez Hill, on the northwest side of the Rancho San Pedro (also called Rancho Domínguez), site of the famous battle during the Mexican–American War called the Battle of Rancho Domínguez in 1846. The mineral rights to this property were owned by Carson Estate Company, the Hellman Family, the Dominguez Estate Company, and the Burnham Exploration Company of Frederick Russell Burnham. Before long a number of refineries were up and running, with over 350 oil derricks, tank farms, and sprawling industrial complexes becoming a familiar part of the scenery. The principal leases were with Shell Oil Company and Union Oil of California and the first two wells were located west of Central Avenue and north of Victoria Street. Oil led to an increase in jobs in the community and a subsequent post-war population surge.

In 2011, Shell was ordered by the Los Angeles Regional Water Quality Control Board to clean up the Carousel Tract neighborhood after the discovery of benzene and methane gas contamination, as well as soil and groundwater contamination.

In 2021, Carson was subjected to an air pollution event as a result of hydrogen sulfide emanating from the nearby Dominguez Channel, and received the nickname "Stinky City".

Geography 

Carson is bordered by West Rancho Dominguez on the north, Torrance on the west, Rancho Dominguez and Long Beach on the southeast, Rolling Hills Estates, and West Carson on the southwest.

Bixby Marshland, a 17-acre wetland habitat, is located in Carson.

Climate 
Carson experiences a warm-summer Mediterranean climate (Köppen climate classification Csb), similar to that of the Los Angeles Basin with noticeably cooler temperatures during the summer due to the nearby Pacific Ocean (which is approximately 6 to 8 miles away). Rainfall is scarce during the summer in Carson but receives enough rainfall throughout the year to avoid Köppen's BSh (semi-arid climate).Carson, like many of the Southern California coastal areas, is subject to a late spring/early summer weather phenomenon called "June Gloom." This involves overcast or foggy skies in the morning which yield to sun by early afternoon.

Demographics

2010 
The 2010 United States Census reported that Carson had a population of 91,714. The racial makeup of Carson was 21,864 (23.8%) White (7.7% Non-Hispanic White), 21,856 (23.8%) African American, 518 (0.6%) Native American, 23,522 (25.6%) Asian (20.9% Filipino, 0.8% Japanese, 0.8% Korean, 0.5% Chinese, 0.4% Vietnamese, 0.4% Asian Indian, 0.2% Cambodian, 0.1% Pakistani, 0.1% Thai), 2,386 (2.6%) Pacific Islander (2.2% Samoan, 0.2% Guamanian, 0.1% Native Hawaiian), 17,151 (18.7%) from other races, and 4,417 (4.8%) from two or more races. Hispanic or Latino of any race were 35,417 persons (38.6%) (32.6% Mexican, 1.1% Salvadoran, 1.0% Guatemalan, 0.6% Puerto Rican, 0.3% Cuban, 0.2% Honduran, 0.2% Peruvian, 0.2% Ecuadorian).

The Census reported that 90,411 people (98.6% of the population) lived in households, 1,170 (1.3%) lived in non-institutionalized group quarters, and 133 (0.1%) were institutionalized.

There were 25,432 households, out of which 10,980 (43.2%) had children under the age of 18 living in them, 14,178 (55.7%) were married couples living together, 4,787 (18.8%) had a female householder with no husband present, 1,761 (6.9%) had a male householder with no wife present. 3,776 households (14.8%) were made up of individuals, and 1,790 (7.0%) had someone living alone who was 65 years of age or older. The average household size was 3.56. There were 20,726 families (81.5% of all households); the average family size was 3.90.

The population was spread out, with 21,992 people (24.0%) under the age of 18, 9,964 people (10.9%) aged 18 to 24, 23,105 people (25.2%) aged 25 to 44, 24,013 people (26.2%) aged 45 to 64, and 12,640 people (13.8%) who were 65 years of age or older. The median age was 37.6 years. For every 100 females, there were 91.9 males. For every 100 females age 18 and over, there were 88.5 males.

The homeowner vacancy rate was 1.3%; the rental vacancy rate was 3.7%. 68,924 people (75.2% of the population) lived in owner-occupied housing units and 21,487 people (23.4%) lived in rental housing units.

2000 
As of the census of 2000, there were 89,730 people, 24,648 households, and 20,236 families residing in the city. The population density was 4,762.2 inhabitants per square mile (1,838.9/km2). The racial makeup of the city was 25.69% White, 25.41% Black or African American, 0.56% Native American, 22.27% Asian, 2.99% Pacific Islander, 17.98% from other races, and 5.09% from two or more races. 34.92% of the population were Hispanic or Latino of any race.

There were 24,648 households, out of which 39.2% had children under the age of 18 living with them, 58.7% were married couples living together, 17.2% had a female householder with no husband present, and 17.9% were non-families. 14.2% of all households were made up of individuals, and 5.9% had someone living alone who was 65 years of age or older. The average household size was 3.59 and the average family size was 3.92.

Age ranges of residents were 28.4% under the age of 18, 9.9% from 18 to 24, 28.5% from 25 to 44, 22.5% from 45 to 64, and 10.7% who were 65 years of age or older. The median age was 34 years. For every 100 females, there were 93.3 males. For every 100 females age 18 and over, there were 89.4 males.

According to a 2006 estimate, the median income for a household in the city was $60,457, and the median income for a family was $66,468. Males had a median income of $33,579 versus $31,110 for females. The per capita income for the city was $17,107. About 7.2% of families and 9.3% of the population were below the poverty line, including 10.9% of those under age 18 and 8.6% of those age 65 or over. Carson has the distinction of being the only incorporated city in the United States where the black population has a higher median income than the white population.

Mexican (28.9%) and Filipino (19.4%) are the most common ancestries in Carson. Philippines (43.7%) and Mexico (39.3%) are the most common foreign places of birth in Carson.

Economy

Top employers 
As of 2021, the top ten employers in the city were:

Former companies 
Nissan previously had its North American headquarters in Carson. One of the buildings, a nine-story tower, had the Nissan logo on it. Vincent Roger of the Los Angeles Times wrote that it "was a familiar sight to drivers passing the intersection of the Harbor and San Diego freeways." Around 2006 the company had 1,500 employees at the headquarters. In 2005 a leak revealed that Nissan planned to move its offices to Tennessee. In the summer of 2006, the Nissan headquarters completed the move. Over half of the employees chose to stay in the Los Angeles area.

Arts and culture
County of Los Angeles Public Library operates the Carson Regional Library and the Dr. Martin Luther King Library. Both libraries are in Carson.

Carson is the site of California State University, Dominguez Hills (CSUDH). CSUDH is a major commuter school, particularly for students from the surrounding cities of Long Beach, Gardena, and Torrance. It was founded as "South Bay College" and then renamed California State University at Palos Verdes. It moved to the City of Carson to meet a significant need for higher education opportunities in the largely black middle class suburbs of Los Angeles. Today it is among the most racially diverse campuses in the United States. The student body does not have a racial or ethnic majority. In 1965, Carson was chosen as the home for the relocating university over the communities of Friendship Park, Fort MacArthur and Torrance.

Carson is also the location of Dignity Health Sports Park, a sports complex including a soccer-specific stadium used by the Los Angeles Galaxy and formerly the Los Angeles Sol, C.D. Chivas USA, and the Los Angeles Chargers of the National Football League (NFL), a tennis stadium which hosts the yearly JP Morgan/Chase tennis tournament, and a track and field facility. It is also the training headquarters for the United States men's national soccer team. It opened in 2003, adjacent to CSUDH. The ADT Event Center is the only permanent indoor velodrome in the U.S. In July 2007, the Galaxy signed international soccer superstar David Beckham to the team. In 2011, International Boxing Hall of Fame Promoter, Bob Arum of Top Rank began publicizing professional boxing events.

One of the Goodyear Blimps was based in Carson. The 1st and 2nd U.S. and International Aviation Meets was held at the Dominguez Hill Rancho in 1910 and 1911, which featured many blimps and zeppelins. The International Printing Museum, which has one of the largest collections of antique printing presses in the United States, is located in Carson.

Carson Mall, now SouthBay Pavilion, opened in 1973 and is located at the Avalon Boulevard exit off the San Diego Freeway (Interstate 405). Major tenants include Burlington, IKEA, JCPenney, Ross, Target, and 24 Hour Fitness.

Sports 
One professional sports team currently plays their home games in Carson;

The Los Angeles Chargers of the NFL played their home games in Carson from 2017 to 2019.

2028 Summer Olympics
Rugby union, modern pentathlon, tennis, field hockey and track cycling will all be held in Carson during the 2028 Summer Olympics.

Former NFL stadium proposals 
As Carson has large tracts of undeveloped land, unusual for a city in such close proximity to metropolitan Los Angeles, various plans for the use of the land have been proposed. One such tract of land located at Del Amo Boulevard, west of the 405, attracted particular attention in the past as a potential site for a National Football League stadium. An outdoor power center complex called Carson Marketplace was originally planned for the site. In February 2015, however, the Marketplace plans were scrapped in favor of a $1.2 billion NFL stadium, backed by Goldman Sachs, that would have hosted both the then-Oakland Raiders and the then-San Diego Chargers. The NFL had previously considered the site as a location for a stadium, but the plans stalled after it was discovered that the site was once used as a toxic waste dump and would require an extensive clean-up operation before construction was legally allowed to commence. In May 2015, the Carson City Council allocated $50 million to clean up the site for either the dual NFL stadium or the originally planned Carson Marketplace as a fallback should the NFL stadium not come to fruition.

On January 12, 2016, NFL owners rejected Carson's bid to host an NFL stadium in favor of the competing bid of SoFi Stadium in Inglewood backed by Rams owner Stan Kroenke. Despite this rejection, the Los Angeles Chargers temporarily played their home games at Dignity Health Sports Park in Carson from 2017 to 2019 while waiting for the construction of SoFi Stadium to be completed.

Government

Municipal government 
According to the city's most recent Comprehensive Annual Financial Report, the city's various funds had $96.3 million in revenues, $81.8 million in expenditures, $611.4 million in total assets, $129.2 million in total liabilities, and $187.2 million in cash and investments.

State and federal representation 

Mayors of Carson

Education

Primary and secondary schools 
Carson is served by the Los Angeles Unified School District.

High schools serving portions of Carson include Carson High School in Carson, Rancho Dominguez Preparatory School in Long Beach, and Banning High School in the Wilmington area of Los Angeles. The area is within Board District 8.

Magnolia Science Academy-3, a public span school (serving grades 6-12) in Carson, is a Magnolia Public Schools campus.

Circa 2019 there were plans to open a campus of the charter school Ganas Academy on the campus of the LAUSD public school Catskill Avenue Elementary School, but there was opposition to this move.

Although the California Academy of Mathematics and Science is located in Carson on the campus of California State University, Dominguez Hills, it is actually a part of the Long Beach Unified School District. The school accepts residents of LBUSD, Compton USD, portions of LAUSD (including sections serving Carson), and other districts.

Infrastructure

Emergency services
Fire protection in Carson is provided by the Los Angeles County Fire Department which operates out of Fire Stations 10, 36, 105, 116, and 127. Ambulance transportation is provided by McCormick Ambulance Service Station 17. The Los Angeles County Sheriff's Department (LASD) operates the Carson Station in Carson.

Health care
The Los Angeles County Department of Health Services operates the Torrance Health Center in Harbor Gateway, Los Angeles, near Torrance and serving Carson.

Post office
The United States Postal Service operates the Carson Post Office at 21350 Avalon Boulevard and the South Bay Pavilion Station in Suite 116 at 20700 Avalon Boulevard.

Transportation 

Prior to the COVID-19 pandemic, the city operated the Carson Circuit bus that serves the local community and connects to other bus and rail transit services including the Los Angeles Metro A Line at the Del Amo Station. Service was suspended on March 28, 2020. However, their Dial-A-Ride services remained in service during that time.

On September 26, 2021, Long Beach Transit began serving Carson with three new routes. On January 3, 2022, Carson Circuit was reinstated with two revised routes.

Historically, the city was served by the Pacific Electric Long Beach Line.

Notable people 

 Ab-Soul, rapper and member of group Black Hippy
 Justin Bibbins, basketball player
 Bishop Lamont, rapper
 Chuckii Booker, singer, songwriter
 The Boys (American band)
 Brandy, singer/actress
 Chad Brown, former National Football League referee
 Antwuan Dixon, professional skateboarder
 Dr. Dre (Andre Young, Sr.), rapper/producer, lived in Carson during his middle school years
 Rocky Fellers, pioneer Asian-American pop/rock band of four young Filipino brothers during the 1960s with multiple hits including the 1963 chart-topper "Killer Joe".
 Vince Ferragamo, NFL quarterback for Los Angeles Rams 1977–86, Super Bowl XIV, played for No. 1-ranked Nebraska 1976, an Academic All American, was LA City's MVP 1972
 The Game (Jayceon Taylor), rapper, lived in Carson age 7 to 15 while in foster care
 Courtney Hall, former San Diego Chargers center and guard 1989–1999
 Ekene Ibekwe, University of Maryland basketball forward, 2012 and 2016 Olympian (Nigerian Basketball National Team)
 Ras Kass, rapper 
 Baby Keem, rapper
 Tommy "Tiny" Lister, actor, NCAA shot put champion and former professional wrestler
 A$ton Matthews, rapper
 Juanita Millender-McDonald, Democratic U.S. Congresswoman from 1996 to 2007
 Michael Quercio, musician
 Ray J (Willie Norwood, Jr.), singer/actor
 Reason, rapper
 Danny Reece, NFL cornerback and punt returner, Tampa Bay Buccaneers 1976–1980, punt return leader 1979 and 1980
 Kris Richard, NFL player and coach
 Albert Robles, mayor of Carson from 2015 until 2020
 Rex Salas, musician
 Ashton Sanders, actor
 Demetrius Shipp Jr., actor
 Gilbert D. Smith, first African-American mayor of Carson 
 SoShy, (Deborah Epstein), a French singer and songwriter
 Kia Stevens, also known as Awesome Kong and Amazing Kong in TNA Wrestling, professional wrestler
 Tammy Townsend, television actress
 Wesley Walker, NFL wide receiver, NY Jets 1977-1989
 Elbert Watts, Green Bay Packers defensive back 1986
 Forest Whitaker, director, producer, and Academy Award-winning actor
 Bob Whitfield, Stanford University graduate, NFL offensive lineman, Atlanta Falcons, New York Giants and Jacksonville Jaguars
 Brett Young, football player

In popular culture 

 Reno 911!
 Jackie Brown
 Gone in 60 Seconds (1974 Version)
 Emergency! (Exteriors of the then-fictional 'Station 51' of the series. The station shown is Station 127 of the Los Angeles County Fire Department)
 Pros vs. Joes
 10 Items or Less
 Larry Crowne

Sister cities
Carson's sister cities are:
 La Carlota, Philippines
 Muntinlupa & Parañaque, Philippines
 Sōka, Japan
 Wanju County, South Korea

See also 

 George Henry Carson
 List of cities in Los Angeles County, California
 Demographics of Filipino Americans

Further reading 
  - Personal account of growing up in Carson.

References

External links 

 

 
1968 establishments in California
Cities in Los Angeles County, California
Incorporated cities and towns in California
Los Angeles Harbor Region
Populated places established in 1968
South Bay, Los Angeles